Georges Demetz (1865–1942) was a French General who fought on the First World War.

He was appointed brigadier general in 1918, and divisional general in 1923.

References

1865 births
1942 deaths
French military personnel of World War I